Angel-lights, in architecture, are the upper panes of glass or "lights'" in a curved window frame, next to the springing.  Probably a corruption of the word angle lights, as the structures are nearly triangular.

References

Windows